is a Japanese singer, songwriter, and lyricist for various anime theme songs and shows, including Record of Lodoss War, Please Save My Earth, Macross Plus, Outlaw Star, Kaze no Stigma, Maoyu, and Aria The Origination.

Biography
Arai joined Victor Music Entertainment after graduating from university. She worked on collaborations with various artists there. Her first single, "Yakusoku" was released in 1986, and was used as an insert song for the anime Windaria. She also released the album Natsukashii Mirai. In 1988 she left her agency. In 1992, she released the singles "Kaze to Tori to Sora ~reincarnation~" and "Kooru Sona" which were used as songs for the Record of Lodoss War anime and The Weathering Continent film, respectively.

Her activity in anime continued with Please Save My Earth. In 1994, she sang "Voices" for the Macross Plus OVA, where she also was the singing voice for Myung Fang Lone and Sharon Apple.  She would later release her first compilation album Sora no mori in 1997. She wrote and performed the two ending songs for the 1998 anime Outlaw Star and contributed songs for Record of Lodoss War: Chronicles of the Heroic Knight. In 1999, she released "Kanaete" for the Puppet Master Sakon anime. In 2001, she released "Hana no katachi" as a song for the Daichis - Earth Defense Family. "Kakusei Toshi" was released for Tokyo Underground in 2002, and "Natsukashii umi" was an opener song for Kurau: Phantom Memory.

In 2009, she performed the opening theme "Mitsu no Yoake" (蜜の夜明け) for the anime television series Spice and Wolf II in 2009 and the ending theme Unknown Vision for Maoyu in 2013.  In 2012, she provided music for Shibuya International's 10th anniversary short film called Birth. 

Arai has performed at many conventions, music festivals, and clubs. In 2005, she celebrated her 20th anniversary in her music career with the compilation album, Sora no Uta, and went on tour to France and Germany in 2006. On March 24, 2013, she performed at Hong Kong Polytechnic University as her first live concert appearance in Asia outside Japan.

Arai has worked with many different music artists. In 1989, she joined Tomoko Tane on some of her albums. She also worked with Yuri Shiratori and composed tracks for the latter's album. In 1998, she and Yayoi Yula released the album Goddess in the morning. She joined a band called Marsh-mallow which released an eponymous album in 2001. In 2011, she worked with a new music group, releasing RuRu Chapeau.

Arai hosted a weekly hour-long radio show called Viridian House and has also named her website after that.

Discography
Older albums and singles were released by Victor (VDR, VICL, VIDL) label, later re-released under FlyingDog (VTCL) on April 25, 2012.

Studio albums

Compilation albums

Concept album

Live albums

Singles

Collaborations

References

External links
 
  (Victor Entertainment)
 French fan-website : https://www.akinoarai-fr.com/
 
 

1959 births
Anime musicians
Japanese women singer-songwriters
Living people
Singers from Tokyo
Outlaw Star
20th-century Japanese women singers
20th-century Japanese singers
21st-century Japanese women singers
21st-century Japanese singers